Niophis neotropica is a species of beetle in the family Cerambycidae. It was described by Martins in 1961.

References

Ectenessini
Beetles described in 1961